The Energieeinsparverordnung (EnEV) is a regulation in Germany describing minimum requirements regarding energy use of new and renovated buildings. To obtain a building license, private buildings and most commercial buildings must be built according to the regulation. It was replaced by the Building Energy Act on November 1, 2020.

The requirements are set to stricter standards in irregular intervals.

See also

 
 Energiewende in Germany

References

External links
 Text der Energieeinsparverordnung (current version) 
 Synopse der Änderungen und Texte der EnEV 2007, 2009 und 2013 
 EnEV 2004 (bis zum 1. Oktober 2007 gültig) 
 Informationen zur EnEV 2009 
 Info Portal Energieeinsparung: Novellierungsverfahren des Energieeinsparrechts 
 BEE: Klimaneutral und kosteneffizient die EnEV 2016 erfüllen. Informationsbroschüre zur Energie-Einspar-Verordnung 2016 
 Informationen zur EnEV 2013 

Energy efficiency
Energy in Germany
Energy law
Law of Germany